Caballococha (Cabalo Cocha) is a town in the Loreto Region in northeastern Peru, located on the Amazon river and right across the river from Colombia. 

It is the capital of both Mariscal Ramón Castilla Province and Ramón Castilla District. , it had a population of 4,028 (1993).

The name of the town is a combination of Spanish and Quechua, meaning "Horse Lake", a nearby body of water. It is a poor town and people live by farming, trading, and fishing. Television has arrived as has the internet and there is even an internet cafe in the market square. Other than some motorcycle/taxis, there are only one or two vehicles in town. There is an airport under construction, but it is difficult to imagine it will see much use.

The town saw itself participating in the Leticia Incident, an event which led to war between Peru and Colombia in 1932. Today a statue exists in the main square dedicated to the soldiers who had to carry ammo and equipment through the jungle during the war.

Notes

External links
 Topographic map Caballcocha, Peru; Colombia SA-19-13, Joint Operations Graphic 1:250,000, U.S. National Imagery and Mapping Agency, 1994

Populated places in the Loreto Region
Populated places on the Amazon
Upper Amazon